The Ponor, also known as Ponar (Понaрь) is a river in Moscow Oblast, Russia. It is a right tributary of the Nerskaya (Moskva tributary). The source is 1 km south from the village of Krupino, Moscow oblast. It flows to the east. Ponor runs into Nerskaya on distance of 5 km on the northeast from the town of Kurovskoye.

The country, which the Ponor runs through, is very boggy and, therefore, difficult for hiking. Wood has only about the mouth, near the outfall of the Nerskaya.

References 

Russian: Вагнер Б. Б. Реки и озера Подмосковья. – М.: Вече, 2007. – pp. 298–299. .

Rivers of Moscow Oblast